Vijaypur is a town, tehsil and municipal committee, nearby Samba town, Jammu city and a notified area committee in Samba district in the Indian union territory of Jammu and Kashmir, situated on the bank of Devak River, known locally as Gupt Ganga. It is one of the most fast-growing towns near Jammu. With AIIMS being developed in the town , it can see more influx of people around the Jammu , Samba and Kathua districts.

Demographics
 India census, Vijaypur had a population of 21044. Males constitute 51% of the population and females 49%. Vijaypur has an average literacy rate of 73%, lower than the national average of 74.4%: male literacy is 77%, and female literacy is 69%.

Religion
Hindu 88.65%, Sikh 7.48%, Muslim 1.38%,

References

Cities and towns in Samba district